Giora Shanan (5May 19089November 2001), Palmach member from 1941. Served in the Palmach Headquarters as Deputy Palmach Commander.

Footnotes

1908 births
2001 deaths
Israeli generals
Palmach members
Jews in Mandatory Palestine